Fiona Benson (born 1978) is an English poet. Her collections have been shortlisted for the T.S. Eliot Prize in 2015 and 2019. Vertigo and Ghost (2019) won Forward Prizes for best collection.

Biography 
Benson was born in Wroughton, England. She received her Master of Letters and PhD in English from Saint Andrew’s University, Scotland, where she wrote her dissertation on the Ophelia figure in Early Modern Drama. She is resident in Thorverton, Devon.

Benson was a recipient of an Eric Gregory Award in 2006. The award is given by the Society of Authors to British poets under 30. Her work was included in Faber New Poets (2009) and her debut collection, Bright Travellers was published in 2014 by Cape Poetry.

Benson was shortlisted for the T.S. Eliot Prize for her poetry collection, Bright Travellers (2015) and also for Vertigo and Ghost (2019).

Ben Wilkinson, in a review of Bright Travellers for The Guardian,  describes Benson as "a poet whose dark imagination mixes solemnity with lyricism, treating the poem as a kind of secular prayer." Themes in Benson's work include "violence and loss, shown most vividly in her accounts of motherhood, are paired seamlessly with moments of great tenderness"

The poem 'Androgeus' was shortlisted for The 2021 Forward Prize for Best Single Poem. It comes from a long mythic sequence retelling the minotaur myth, which tries to reinstate Pasiphaë, the minotaur’s mother, at the centre of the story. This is included in her latest collection, Ephemeron (2022).

Awards
 Eric Gregory Award (2006)
  Faber New Poets Award (2006)
 Seamus Heaney First Collection Poetry Prize (2015) for Bright Travellers
 Geoffrey Faber Memorial Prize (2015) for Bright Travellers
 Forward Prizes for Poetry Best Single Poem (2018) from Vertigo and Ghost and also best collection.

Work
 Bright Travellers, Cape Poetry, (2014)
 Vertigo and Ghost, Cape Poetry, (2019) 
 Ariadne, Broken Sleep Books, (2021)
  Ephemeron, Jonathan Cape, (2022)

References

1978 births
Living people
21st-century English poets
English women poets
Alumni of the University of St Andrews
21st-century English women writers